Una O'Dwyer is a camogie player, winner of the Texaco Player of the Year award in 2004, an All-Star award in 2004, a Lynchpin award, predecessor of the All Star awards, in 2003 and All Ireland medals in 1999, 2000, 2001, 2003 and 2004.

Career
She played in eight successive All Ireland finals for Tipperary winning five All Ireland medals in 1999, 2000, 2001, captaining the team in 2003 and winning the Irish Independent player of the match award in 2004. She won her first All Ireland senior club medal with Cashel in 2007  and captained the team to victory against Athenry in 2009. She captained the UCC team to Ashbourne Cup success in 2003.

Other awards
In 2003, she was named as Irish Tatler magazine's 'Woman of the Year Highly Commended Sports Star'.

References

External links
 Profile in Cúl4kidz magazine
 Profile in Sunday Independent 15 September 2002
 Profile in Sunday Independent 21 September 2003

Living people
Tipperary camogie players
Year of birth missing (living people)
UCC camogie players